Major William Cadogan (1601–1661), of Liscarton, County Meath, was born at Dunster, Somerset, to Henry Cadogan of Llanbetter, Pembrokeshire. His great-grandfather, Thomas Cadogan, of Dunster, claimed descent from the ancient princes of Wales (called Cadwgan). He was the father of the Dublin barrister Henry Cadogan and the grandfather of William Cadogan, 1st Earl Cadogan.

He served as MP for Monaghan Borough from 1639 to 1649 and was a cavalry major in Oliver Cromwell's army. In 1649, he ordered the destruction of Trim's old Augustinian abbey's belfry, known as the Yellow Steeple, as it had been used as a watch-tower by the Catholic rebels. As a reward for defending Trim Castle, County Meath, during the English Civil War and for putting down revolts around Dublin, he was given the governorship of Trim Castle. In 1658 he was appointed High Sheriff of Meath.

He died in Dublin on 14 March 1661. He had married Elizabeth Roberts and had a son Henry.

References

1601 births
1661 deaths
W
Politicians from County Meath
People from West Somerset (district)
High Sheriffs of Meath
Irish MPs 1639–1649
Members of the Parliament of Ireland (pre-1801) for County Monaghan constituencies